The $1,000,000 Chance of a Lifetime is an hour-long prime time quiz show that aired in Australia. It was later adapted for an American audience as It's Your Chance of a Lifetime, so as not to be confused with the American game show that used the title The $1,000,000 Chance of a Lifetime.

Overview 
The $1,000,000 Chance of a Lifetime aired on the Seven Network from 1999 to 2000. Seven began production on the show when rival network Nine Network announced production of Who Wants to Be a Millionaire?, which promised the largest cash prize on Australian quiz show history.

Chance of a Lifetime was produced in-house by Seven. It was a knowledge based quiz. The million dollar prize was never won; only smaller amounts of money were awarded to contestants.

Hosts 
Frank Warrick first hosted the show in 1999. For the second and last season, Seven personality and sportscaster Sandy Roberts was Warrick's replacement.

Rules of the game 
A solo player competed for a chance to win over $1,000,000 in the form of an annuity, doing so by answering ten questions. The first question was dubbed the "Credit Card Question", with a correct answer eliminating any credit card bill debt the contestant had rung up (the bill itself was shredded onstage).

The next question was worth $5,000, and a contestant had to answer correctly to advance. If correct, the contestant would have a maximum of eight questions to answer, being forced to bet at least half of what they had at that particular point in the game. The catch was that each question came from one of ten different categories, and the contestant never knew where they would come from. However, the contestant was shown the category before the question was asked, so they would know and could bet accordingly.

Along the way, each contestant had two "Second Chances". One "Second Chance" allowed the contestant to switch the question for one in a category of their choice, and the other allowed the question to be made multiple choice. Once a contestant reached the third level of questions, a "Last Chance" was awarded, allowing the contestant to choose one of the two options for a second time.

A contestant could stop after any correct answer, but an incorrect answer deducted the amount of the wager and ended the game for the contestant. Even a miss on the credit card question ended the game. (If the contestant answered the credit card question correctly, their debt was eliminated for good even if they ended on the game on zero.)

A possible $1,280,000 was available to a contestant.

Ratings 
Chance aired on Monday nights on Seven. Ratings began to slide after the first episode aired. The show ran for two seasons, and was eventually moved to weeknights at  before the nightly news broadcast; it was then Seven began the practice of airing quiz shows as a lead-in to its news bulletins, which continues to this day. It was eventually cancelled, with weaker ratings and excessive production costs cited as reasons for cancellation.

See also 
 List of Australian television series

References

External links 
 
 History of Australian TV Quiz Shows

Seven Network original programming
1990s Australian game shows
2000s Australian game shows
1999 Australian television series debuts
2000 Australian television series endings
English-language television shows